Tuggerawong, often referred to by the locals as "Gods Country" and not to be confused with Tuggeranong, is a lakeside suburb of Wyong on the NSW Central Coast and is located approximately 7 kilometres east of the Wyong CBD. It is approximately 90 km north of Sydney and 55 km south of Newcastle. Shopping, commercial facilities, schools and all normal community services are available in the district. In Wyong there is a rail connection and there is a connection to the M1 Pacific Motorway at Tuggerah.

References

Suburbs of the Central Coast (New South Wales)